Yeongam is a city and county in South Jeolla Province, South Korea. Bordered with Mokpo and Naju to the north, Jangheung County to the east, and Haenam and Gangjin to the south, Yeongam County comprises two eups and nine myeons, populated with about 57,000 people, and its county hall is seated in Yeongam-eup.

The Korean Grand Prix was held along the harbor side, at the Korea International Circuit from 2010 to 2013. The track has been designed by the famous race track designer Hermann Tilke. The circuit is part permanent, part temporary. Construction began in 2007, and was completed in September/October 2010. The circuit had a contract to host the Grand Prix until 2016. After that, a 5-year option would have to be picked up to keep the race until at least 2021. However the race was cancelled after 2013.

Climate

Industry
Hyundai Samho Heavy Industries (HSHI), world's 5th largest ship builder and the largest company in South Jeolla Province, is located in Samho Eup. Not only the company itself but also numerous cooperative firms of HSHI are headquartered in Daebul Industrial District in Samho Eup.

Twin towns – sister cities
Yeongam is twinned with:

  Yeongdeungpo-gu, Seoul, South Korea
  Sancheong, South Korea
  Huzhou, China
  Hirakata, Japan

References

External links
 Official website of the County Government

 
Counties of South Jeolla Province